"No One Else Comes Close" is a song by American R&B singer Joe. It was written by Joe, Gary Baker, and Wayne Perry for his second studio album All That I Am, featuring production from Joe and Edwin Nicholas. Released as the album's fifth single, the song peaked at number 41 on the UK Singles Chart.

Track listings

Cover versions
The Backstreet Boys covered the song as the eleventh track on their 1999 album Millennium. In an interview with Billboard, co-writer Gary Baker discussed development of the song:
I had a writing day with Joe Thomas and Wayne Perry, then I played it to Clive and he said, "I want Joe to do this, but I also want to put it on Millennium." It was extremely exciting because I love Joe and his version is unbelievable, but that Millennium record -- man, that was the record to be on!

Credits and personnel
Credits adapted from the liner notes of All That I Am.
 Vocals by Joe Thomas
 Written by Gary Baker, Joe Thomas, and Wayne Perry
 Produced by Joe Thomas and Edwin Nicholas
 Recording by Earl Cohen
 Mastering by Jed Hackett
 Mixing by Gerard Smerek
 Guitar by George Walderius
 Recorded at The Crib (Maplewood, New Jersey) and BearTracks Studios

Charts

References

1997 songs
1998 singles
Joe (singer) songs
Songs written by Joe (singer)
Song recordings produced by Joe (singer)
Jive Records singles
Songs written by Gary Baker (songwriter)
Songs written by Wayne Perry (country music)